Boys' High School & College (BHS) is an independent school in Prayagraj (Allahabad), India. It was founded in 1861 to provide a Christian education to the children of Europeans and Anglo-Indians, but has always accepted children from all backgrounds. Though originally co-educational, it now admits only boys.
It has existed on its present site in central Allahabad since 1861. Since 1940 it has been managed by the Allahabad High School Society. It is currently affiliated to the Council for the Indian School Certificate Examinations.

On 5 November 2013. governor B.L. Joshi released a commemorative postage stamp to mark 150th anniversary of Boys' High School.

History

Established in 1861, the school was founded and initially run by the Church of England. From 1898 to 1914, Boys' High School was affiliated to the University of Allahabad.

Holy Trinity School 
In 1988, the Holy Trinity School located in Allengunj, was established as an annex of the Boys' High School & College. HTS's current headmaster is Lokmani Lal.

Notable alumni

 Amitabh Bachchan, an Indian film actor, film producer, television host, occasional playback singer and former politician.
 Brahma Nath Katju, former Chief Justice of the Allahabad High Court.
 Vikas Swarup, an Indian diplomat and writer. (Oscar winning Slumdog Millionaire, a 2008 British drama film is a loose adaptation of the novel Q & A (2005) by Vikas Swarup)
Yogendra Narain, former Secretary-General of Rajya Sabha.
Nikhil Chopra, a retired Indian cricketer.
Deepraj Rana, an Indian and Nepali film and television actor.
Raghuraj Pratap Singh, an Indian politician.
Kunwar Rewati Raman Singh, an Indian politician.

References

External links
 Official website

Boys' schools in India
Primary schools in Uttar Pradesh
High schools and secondary schools in Uttar Pradesh
Schools in Allahabad
Educational institutions established in 1861
1861 establishments in British India